Mark Charles Pigott (born February 6, 1954) is an American businessman and philanthropist. He has been Executive Chairman of the Board of Directors of PACCAR, Inc. since April 2014. He was previously Chairman and Chief Executive Officer of PACCAR from January 1997 to April 2014.  Pigott has been highlighted as one of the US's leading CEOs by Forbes magazine, in their annual listing of the top ten CEOs in the country.

Education
Pigott was born in San Francisco and raised in Seattle. He has lived in many cities in North America, studied in Italy, and worked in the United Kingdom from 1984 to 1989.  He graduated from Stanford University receiving his B.S. in Industrial Engineering (1976), an M.S. in Business (1984),  and a B.A. in Humanities (1998).  He has received an Honorary Doctorate in Science (Sc. D.) from Trinity College, Dublin (2007), an Honorary Doctorate of Laws (LL.D.) from Gonzaga University (2008), an Honorary Doctorate of Humane Letters (D.H.L.) from Lehman College, NY (2010), an Honorary Doctorate of Fine Arts from the University of Puget Sound, WA (2014), an Honorary Doctorate of Humane Letters from the University of Washington, WA (2016), and an Honorary Doctorate from Washington State University, WA (2019).

Business career
Mark Pigott's career with PACCAR began in 1978.  He is the fourth generation of the Pigott family to lead the company. PACCAR (revenues $23.5 billion) (Nasdaq:PCAR) is publicly traded and is a global technology leader in the capital goods and financial services industries. PACCAR's major brands are DAF Trucks, Kenworth and Peterbilt trucks, PACCAR Financial, PacLease, PACCAR Parts, PACCAR Information Technology and PACCAR Powertrain.

Under Pigott's leadership as Chairman and CEO, PACCAR has delivered a 1,700 percent total return to shareholders.  Pigott's focus on quality and innovation has resulted in PACCAR receiving many J.D. Power and Associates Awards for highest customer satisfaction as well as International Truck of the Year Awards.

Pigott has been Chairman of the DAF Supervisory Board since 1996, served on The Business Council (Washington, D.C.) (retired), and on the Washington State Business Roundtable Executive Committee (retired).

Harvard Business Review (January 2010) named Pigott as one of the top 50 global CEO's based on long term shareholder returns.

Philanthropy
Mark Pigott is President of the PACCAR Foundation, which annually donates $5–$10 million in support of education, social services and the arts.  Beneficiaries include University of North Texas (2006), Stanford University (2006), Mississippi State University (2007), Gonzaga University (2006), East Mississippi Community College (2007),  University of Washington (2008), Seattle University (2009), University of Puget Sound (2013) and Washington State University (2014). Pigott established the prestigious PACCAR Award for Teaching Excellence at the University of Washington in 1997. This is the highest honorarium teaching award for MBA professors in the United States. Pigott's strong support of corporate giving is demonstrated by the fact that in 2014, PACCAR was ranked fifth on a list of 25 top large corporate philanthropists in the state of Washington by the Puget Sound Business Journal Book of Lists.

On a personal basis, Pigott has funded professorships and many scholarships at Stanford University, Gonzaga University, Cambridge University, and Trinity College, Dublin.

Pigott holds seats on the Board of the Royal Shakespeare Company America, The British Library Foundation, St. George's Society (New York) Advisory Board, and Trinity College Foundation.  He is a life member of the National Gallery London, The British Library, Royal Society for the encouragement of Arts, Manufacture Commerce (RSA), and the Royal National Theatre, UK. Major philanthropy activities of his include strategic planning and implementation of capital projects at St Paul's Cathedral, London. An avid bibliophile, Pigott is involved in numerous projects benefiting the British Library and the Folger Shakespeare Library. He established the annual Pigott Poetry Prize in Ireland (2014). For over a decade, his dedication to educating the next generation of leaders is evidenced by his participation as a lecturer at numerous graduate schools of business, including the University of Washington, Seattle University, Trinity College, Dublin and Cambridge University.

Personal life
Pigott lives in Medina, Washington with his wife Cindy. He is a member of Augusta National Golf Club.

Awards and honors
Mark Pigott has been awarded numerous honors, awards, and knighthoods over the course of his career. Notable awards include:

References

Other sources
 BusinessWeek – “Thinking Outside the Truck”
 PACCAR - The Pursuit of Quality, Alex Groner and Barry Provorse; Documentary Media, Seattle, Washington, 2005 – 4th Edition
 Kenworth Trucks: The First 75 Years, Doug Siefkes; Sasquatch Books, Printed in Canada, 1998
 PACCAR Inc Business Background Report, ChoiceLevel Books, Filiquarian Publishing, LLC / Qontro, June 12, 2009

External links
PACCAR Inc

American businesspeople
1954 births
Living people
Commanders of the Order of the Crown (Belgium)
Stanford University School of Engineering alumni
People from Medina, Washington
Honorary Knights Commander of the Order of the British Empire